Leucoptera andalusica is a moth in the family Lyonetiidae that is endemic to the Iberian Peninsula.

The larvae feed on Chamaespartium tridentatum. They either mine in the stems or the broad wings along the stem.

The mine is frass, is not contrasted and is greenish in colour.

References

External links
Leucoptera andalusica

Leucoptera (moth)
Moths described in 1994
Endemic fauna of Spain
Moths of Europe